is a former Japanese football player.

Playing career
Suzuki was born in Yamagata Prefecture on April 21, 1969. After graduating from high school, he joined Prefectural Leagues club NEC Yamagata (later Montedio Yamagata) in 1988. He played many matches as goalkeeper and the club was promoted to Regional Leagues from 1990, Japan Football League from 1994 and J2 League from 1999. Although he played as regular player for a long time, his opportunity to play decreased behind Takeshi Saito and Shigeru Sakurai from 2002. He retired end of 2004 season.

Club statistics

References

External links

1969 births
Living people
Association football people from Yamagata Prefecture
Japanese footballers
J2 League players
Japan Football League (1992–1998) players
Montedio Yamagata players
Association football goalkeepers